Plagiobrissus is a genus of echinoderms belonging to the family Brissidae.

The species of this genus are found in Mediterranean and America.

Species:

Plagiobrissus abeli 
Plagiobrissus abruptus 
Plagiobrissus africanus 
Plagiobrissus costae 
Plagiobrissus costaricensis 
Plagiobrissus elevatus 
Plagiobrissus grandis 
Plagiobrissus jullieni 
Plagiobrissus lamberti 
Plagiobrissus latus 
Plagiobrissus loveni 
Plagiobrissus malavassii 
Plagiobrissus pacificus 
Plagiobrissus perplexus 
Plagiobrissus robustus

References

Brissidae
Echinoidea genera